This is a list of sovereign states in the 1910s, giving an overview of states around the world during the period between 1 January 1910 and 31 December 1919. It contains entries, arranged alphabetically, with information on the status and recognition of their sovereignty. It includes widely recognized sovereign states, and entities which were de facto sovereign but which were not widely recognized by other states.

Sovereign states

1910-1919
1910s politics-related lists